Friend and Foe is the third release from the Portland, Oregon-based band Menomena. It was released January 23, 2007 by Barsuk Records. The cover art is designed by Craig Thompson, writer and illustrator of the award-winning graphic novel Blankets.

Track listing
All songs written by Menomena: .
 "Muscle'n Flo" – 4:20
 "The Pelican" – 3:38
 "Wet and Rusting" – 3:33
 "Air Aid" – 4:44
 "Weird" – 3:04
 "Rotten Hell" – 4:18
 "Running" – 1:52
 "My My" – 3:48
 "Boyscout'n" – 5:18
 "Evil Bee" – 4:45
 "Ghostship" – 2:28
 "West" – 5:51

Accolades

Songs

Charts

References

External links
Listen to select tracks
Download the track "Wet and Rusting"
Listen to the whole album for free

Menomena albums
2007 albums
Barsuk Records albums
Art pop albums